Maumee Township is one of twenty townships in Allen County, Indiana, United States. As of the 2010 census, its population was 2,620.

Geography

Cities, towns, villages
 Woodburn

Unincorporated towns
 Bluecast at 
(This list is based on USGS data and may include former settlements.)

Adjacent townships
 Scipio Township (north)
 Carryall Township, Paulding County, Ohio (northeast)
 Harrison Township, Paulding County, Ohio (east)
 Jackson Township (south)
 Jefferson Township (southwest)
 Milan Township (west)
 Springfield Township (northwest)

Cemeteries
The township contains Diehl Cemetery.

Major highways

School districts
 East Allen County Schools

Political districts
 Indiana's 3rd congressional district
 State House District 79
 State Senate District 14

References

Citations

Sources
 United States Census Bureau 2008 TIGER/Line Shapefiles
 United States Board on Geographic Names (GNIS)
 IndianaMap

Townships in Allen County, Indiana
Fort Wayne, IN Metropolitan Statistical Area
Townships in Indiana